Doctor of Osteopathic Medicine (DO or D.O., or in Australia DO USA) is a medical degree conferred by the 38 osteopathic medical schools in the United States. DO and Doctor of Medicine (MD) degrees are equivalent: a DO graduate may become licensed as a physician  or surgeon and thus have full medical and surgical practicing rights in all 50 US states. , there were 168,701 osteopathic physicians and medical students in DO programs across the United States. Osteopathic medicine emerged historically from osteopathy, but has become a distinct profession.

, more than 28% of all US medical students were DO students.  The curricula at DO-granting medical schools are equivalent to those at MD-granting medical schools, which focus the first two years on the biomedical and clinical sciences, then two years on core clinical training in the clinical specialties.

One notable difference between DO and MD training is that DOs spend an additional 300–500 hours to study a set of hands-on manipulation (OMT) of the human musculoskeletal system along with learning conventional Western medicine and surgery like their MD peers.

Upon completing osteopathic medical school, a DO graduate must enter an internship or residency training program, which may be followed by fellowship training. DO graduates attend the same graduate medical education programs as their MD counterparts.

History 

Osteopathy, the older form of osteopathic medicine, began in the United States in 1874. The term "osteopathy" was coined by the physician and surgeon Andrew Taylor Still, who named his new discipline of medicine "osteopathy", reasoning that "the bone, osteon, was the starting point from which [he] was to ascertain the cause of pathological conditions". He founded the American School of Osteopathy (now A.T. Still University of the Health Sciences) in Kirksville, Missouri, for the teaching of osteopathy on May 10, 1892. While the state of Missouri granted the right to award the MD degree, he remained dissatisfied with the limitations of conventional medicine and instead chose to retain the distinction of the DO degree. In 1898 the American Institute of Osteopathy started the Journal of Osteopathy (presently known as the Journal of Osteopathic Medicine) and by that time four states recognized the profession.

The osteopathic medical profession has evolved into two branches: non-physician manual medicine osteopaths, who were educated and trained outside the United States; and US-trained osteopathic physicians, who conduct a full scope of medical and surgical practice. The regulation of non-physician manual medicine osteopaths varies greatly between jurisdictions. In the United States, osteopathic physicians holding the DO degree have the same rights, privileges, and responsibilities as physicians with a Doctor of Medicine (MD) degree. Osteopathic physicians and non-physician osteopaths are so distinct that in practice they function as separate professions.

As originally conceived by Andrew Still, the letters "DO" stood for "Diplomate in Osteopathy" and the title conferred by the degree was "Doctor of Osteopathy". Subsequently, the degree also came to be entitled "Doctor of Osteopathic Medicine". Since the late 20th century, the AOA has preferred that this title be used exclusively. Its members resolved at a 1960 conference:

A minority of DOs continue to use the old terms, and the American Academy of Osteopathy retains the old usage in its name.

Demographics
In 2018, there were 114,425 osteopathic medical doctors in the United States and 145,343 total DOs and osteopathic medical students. The proportion of females in the profession has steadily increased since the 1980s.  In 1985, about 10 percent of DO physicians were female, compared with 41 percent in 2018. Between 2008 and 2012, 49 percent of new DO graduates were females.

During the 2011–12 academic year, the osteopathic medical student body consisted of: 69 percent white/non-Hispanic, 19 percent Asian or Pacific Islander, 3.5 percent Hispanic, 3 percent African-American, and 0.5 percent Native American or Alaskan. The remainder were listed as "other or not entered". The five-year change in osteopathic medical student enrollment by ethnicity has increased by 19 percent for white/non-Hispanic students, 36 percent for Asian-American students, 24 percent for Black/African American students, and 60 percent for Hispanic/Latino students.

Education, training and distinctiveness 

Osteopathic medical school curricula are equivalent to those at schools granting the MD degree (Doctor of Medicine). Both US-granted MD and US-granted DO programs are listed in the World Directory of Medical Schools as medical schools. Once admitted to an osteopathic medical school, students study for four years to graduate. The schooling is divided into the pre-clinical and clinical years. The pre-clinical years, the first and second years, focus on the biomedical and clinical sciences. The clinical years, the third and fourth years, consist of core clinical training and sub-internships in the clinical specialties.

Osteopathic medical school accreditation standards require training in internal medicine, obstetrics/gynecology, pediatrics, family medicine, surgery, psychiatry, emergency medicine, radiology, preventive medicine, and public health. According to Harrison's Principles of Internal Medicine, "the training, practice, credentialing, licensure, and reimbursement of osteopathic physicians is virtually indistinguishable from those of physicians with MD qualifications, with 4 years of osteopathic medical school followed by specialty and subspecialty training and board certification".

DO schools provide an additional 300–500 hours in the study of hands-on manual medicine and the body's musculoskeletal system, which is referred to as osteopathic manipulative medicine (OMM). Osteopathic physicians use OMM predominantly to treat musculoskeletal conditions.

Before entering osteopathic medical school, an applicant must complete a four-year undergraduate degree and take a national standardized exam called the Medical College Admissions Test (MCAT). Some combined undergraduate/medical programs exist. Some authors note the differences in the average MCAT scores and grade point average of students who matriculate at DO schools compared to those who matriculate at MD schools within the United States. In 2021, the average MCAT and GPA for students entering US-based MD programs were 511.5 and 3.73, respectively, and 504.0 and 3.55 for DO matriculants. DO medical schools are more likely to accept non-traditional students, who are older and entering medicine as a second career, or coming from non-science majors.

DO medical students are required to take the Comprehensive Osteopathic Medical Licensure Examination (COMLEX-USA), which is sponsored by the National Board of Osteopathic Medical Examiners (NBOME). The COMLEX-USA is series of four osteopathic medical licensing examinations. The first three exams of the COMLEX-USA are taken during medical school and are prerequisites for residency programs. Level 2 consists of a multiple-choice portion and a patient evaluation exam (PE). COMLEX-Level 2 PE is available in Chicago, Illinois, and Philadelphia, Pennsylvania. It is graded as a Pass/Fail exam. Finally, COMLEX Level 3 is taken during the first year of residency.

In addition to the COMLEX-USA, DO medical students may choose to sit for the MD licensure examinations, which are called the United States Medical Licensing Examination (USMLE). This is typically done under specific circumstances, such as when the student desires to enter a residency that may have a historic preference for the USMLE, or if a higher USMLE score would help elevate the student's application to be more competitive. USMLE pass rates for DO and MD students in 2012 are as follows: Step 1: 91% and 94%, Step 2 CK: 96% and 97%, and Step 2 CS: 87% and 97%, respectively (this number may be misleading as only 46 DO students compared to 17,118 MD students were evaluated for Step 2 CS) Step 3: 100% and 95% (this number may be misleading, as only 16 DO students compared to 19,056 MD students, were evaluated for Step 3).

Licensing and board certification 
To obtain a license to practice medicine in the United States, osteopathic medical students must pass the Comprehensive Osteopathic Medical Licensing Examination (COMLEX), the licensure exam administered by the National Board of Osteopathic Medical Examiners throughout their medical training. Students are given the option of also taking the United States Medical Licensing Examination (USMLE) to apply for certain residency programs that may want USMLE scores in addition to COMLEX scores. Those that have received or are in the process of earning an MD or DO degree are both eligible to sit for the USMLE. Because of their additional training, only DO candidates are eligible to sit for the COMLEX.

Upon completion of internship and residency requirements for their chosen medical specialty, holders of the DO may elect to be board certified by either a specialty board (through the American Medical Association's American Board of Medical Specialties) or an osteopathic specialty board (through the American Osteopathic Association Bureau of Osteopathic Specialists certifying boards) or both. In February 2014, the American Osteopathic Association and the Accreditation Council for Graduate Medical Education agreed to unify standard and osteopathic graduate medical education starting in 2020.

Depending on the state, medical licensure may be issued from a combined board (DO and MD) or a separate board of medical examiners. All of the 70 state medical boards are members of the Federation of State Medical Boards.

Retired MD and U.S. Air Force flight surgeon Harriet Hall stated that DOs trained in the U.S. are Doctors of Osteopathic Medicine and are legally equivalent to MDs. "They must be distinguished from 'osteopaths', members of a less regulated or unregulated profession that is practiced in many countries. Osteopaths get inferior training that can't be compared to that of DOs."

International variations 
Currently, there are no osteopathic medical programs located outside of the United States that would qualify an individual to practice as an osteopathic physician in the United States. Foreign osteopathic degrees are not recognized by any state in the US as being equivalent to American DO degrees.

International practice rights 
The International Labour Organization (ILO), an agency of the United Nations, issued a letter affirming that U.S.-trained osteopathic physicians are fully licensed physicians who prescribe medication and perform surgery. The acknowledgment draws a clear separation between American DOs, who are medical doctors, and non-physician osteopaths trained outside of the United States. Within the international standards that classify jobs to promote international comparability across occupations, U.S.-trained DOs are now categorized with all other physicians as medical doctors. This event took place in June 2018 and started a relay of events and opened doors for DOs as more countries started to understand and give full recognition to US-trained medical doctors with the DO degree, e.g. the Association of Medical Councils of Africa (AMCOA) approved a resolution in 2019 granting the AOA's request that AMCOA recognize U.S.-trained DOs as fully licensed physicians with practice rights equivalent to MDs, opening its 20 member countries, which include Botswana, Eswatini, Gambia, Ghana, Kenya, Lesotho, Liberia, Malawi, Mauritius, Namibia, Nigeria, Rwanda, Seychelles, Sierra Leone, South Africa, South Sudan, Tanzania, Uganda, Zambia, and Zimbabwe to DOs. (Note: Some of the member African countries of AMCOA had independently licensed DOs before; however, this recognition unifies those who did or did not). Furthermore, DOs may work internationally with any humanitarian organization such as the World Health Organization and Doctors Without Borders. The following is an international licensure summary for US-trained Doctors of Osteopathic Medicine, as listed by the American Osteopathic Association, that shows countries where US DOs have previously applied for licensure (countries not listed are regions with no history of US DOs applying for licensure):

See also
 List of medical schools in the United States

Notes and references

External links
 One DO's description on "What Is A DO?"
 Doctor of Osteopathic Medicine (D.O.) – National Institutes of Health

Academic degrees in healthcare
Doctoral degrees
Academic degrees of the United States
Medical degrees
Osteopathic medicine